Whale tail is the Y-shaped rear portion of a thong or G-string when visible above the waistline of low-rise pants, shorts, or skirts that resembles a  whale's tail. Popularized by a number of female celebrities including Christina Aguilera, Victoria Beckham, Mariah Carey, Paris Hilton and Britney Spears, displaying whale tails became popular in the early 2000s, together with the popularity of low-rise jeans and thong panties; but quickly waned within the decade.

Low-waisted trousers, such as low-rise jeans or hip-huggers, and higher-cut thongs led to greater exposure of the whale tail. The trend was also associated with the trend of sporting lower back tattoos.

The word was selected by the American Dialect Society in January 2006 as the "most creative word" of 2005.

History
The rising popularity of low-rise jeans led to increased exposure of thong tops in the early 2000s. Britney Spears has been portrayed as a major contributor to the whale tail's popularity. Her whale tail display has been referred to in such creative literature books as Married to a Rock Star by Shemane Nugent, Thong on Fire by Noire,  The Magical Breasts of Britney Spears by Ryan G. Van Cleave, and Off-Color by Janet McDonald. The Oregonian, a Portland, Oregon, newspaper, wrote in 2004 that an abundance of whale tails had become a distraction on the campus. Social commentator Ann C. Hall identified this campus trend as an "apparent intersection between everyday campus fashion and soft porn". The layered clothing trend of the early 2000s was partly led by the whale tail style that incorporates hip-hugger jeans, crop tops and high riding thongs popularized by celebrities.

Rise

By the mid-2000s, whale tails became common to celebrities, providing opportunities to the paparazzi. Whale tail display spawned a new accessory—clip-on jewelry for the visible straps. Jess Cartner-Morley of The Guardian claimed that following pop stars in the hipster trousers gave rise to the "low-slung jeans, whale-tail G-string era". On 17 September 2004, a writer for the Chicago Sun-Times stated, "Britney Spears and Christina Aguilera regularly were photographed with thong straps riding high above their low-rise jeans. And even usually tasteful Halle Berry succumbed to the thong craze by attending an awards show with bejeweled thong straps peeking out from above her miniskirt." Actresses Gillian Anderson, Natalie Portman, Sarah Jessica Parker, Kim Cattrall and Tara Reid, MTV's Molly Sims, model Kate Moss, singers Beyoncé Knowles, Mariah Carey, Jennifer Lopez, Janet Jackson, LeAnn Rimes and Britney Spears have been associated as propagators of the trend by ABC.

In France, clothing brands started creating the thong or le string in styles that encourage a projection above low-hung jeans, such as designs that had small jewels or luminous stars sewn into the "tail". In India, thongs peeked out of low-rise jeans in page three parties and university bashes. Indian model Shefali Zariwala displayed a whale tail in the MTV Immies-winning music video "Kaanta Lagaa" and shot to fame and public debate in 2003. In Japan, clothing company Sanna's brought forward an extreme low-rise hip-hugging jeans design with built-in thong whale tails. R&B artist Sisqó rhapsodized about whale tails in his "Thong Song"—"I like it when the beat goes da na da na/Baby make your booty go da na da na/Girl I know you wanna show da na da na/That thong thong thong thong."  Pornographic film director Mike Metropolis made three films based on whale tails—Whale Tail (2005), Whale Tail I (2005) and Whale Tail II (2006)—with Mark Ashley in the lead. Another movie titled Whale Tail: Thong Dreams was released in 2005 featuring Sunny Lane and Kirsten Price. In 2003, web content developer Gavin Hamilton created the site whale-tail.com with content featuring whale tail display. The domain name WhaleTail.com sold for $6,600 in October 2004. The website has been quoted by ABC Radio, NY Times, FHM (UK) and Fuel Magazine (Australia), and has been nominated as a Best Adult Web Site by Australian Adult Industry Awards in 2008.

Legal debates
In 2004, Louisiana, USA State Representative Derrick Shepherd proposed a bill (HB1626), also known as the Baggy Pants Bill to Louisiana House of Representatives. The bill proposed that "it shall be unlawful for any person to appear in public wearing his pants below his waist and thereby exposing his skin or intimate clothing" and that violators would be subjected to three eight-hour days of community service and a fine of up to US$175. The measure died in the face of opposition from the American Civil Liberties Union. The bill was proposed again in 2008 and was rejected by a state Senate panel. In two Louisiana towns, Delcambre (a maximum penalty of US$615 fine or up to six months in prison) and Opelousas (a maximum penalty of US$500 fine or up to six months in prison), wearing low slung pants that reveal buttock cleavage or undergarments is considered a misdemeanor. Garments that reveal underpants were banned in four other Louisiana towns including Alexandria and Shreveport, where violators face fines of US$150 or 15 days in jail, as well as Hawkinsville, Georgia.

In February 2005, the Senate Courts of Justice Committee of Virginia voted unanimously in a hastily convened meeting against a bill proposed by Delegate Algie T. Howell Jr. (Norfolk, Virginia) to impose a US$50 fine on any person who publicly and intentionally "wears and displays his below-waist undergarments, intended to cover a person's intimate parts, in a lewd or indecent manner" in a public place. The bill (HB1981), also known as the Droopy Drawers Bill, was earlier passed by Virginia House of Delegates by a 60–34 vote. Atlanta, GA, Dallas, TX, Baltimore, MD, Charlotte, NC, Yonkers, NY, Duncan, OK, Natchitoches, LA, Stratford, CT, Pine Bluff, AR, Trenton, NJ, Pleasantville, NJ, as well as three other Georgia towns, Rome, Brunswick and Plains have seen attempts to ban underwear peeking over the pants. School dress codes sometimes also banned some low-rising pants or visible underwear.

Decline
The trend of wearing whale tail-revealing jeans started to dissipate somewhat in the mid-2000s when American clothing designers started shifting focus from low-slung jeans and exposed midriffs to high-waisted trousers and cardigans. Jess Cartner-Morley, fashion writer of The Guardian, claimed that the whale tail and the muffin top (the bulge of flesh hanging over the top of low-rider jeans), "twin crimes of modern fashion", had led to the decline in the popularity of hipster jeans. She quoted Louise Hunn, editor of the British edition of InStyle, as saying—"When a look goes too mainstream, people start wearing it badly. And then the really fashionable people run a mile". While the thong still represented 24% of the US$2.5 billion annual market in women's underwear, it stopped growing by end of 2004. Some vendors, including Victoria's Secret and DKNY, started selling thongs that do not result in whale tails. Adam Lippes, founder of the lingerie line ADAM, said, "Women got tired of it. And they got sick and tired of seeing string hanging out of the top of every celebrity's jeans."

Resurgence
In 2019, publications including Vogue and the Daily Record began referring to a revived interest in the trend, with influencers such as Kim Kardashian, Hailey Baldwin and Dua Lipa prominently wearing it. The trend has made a comeback in kpop in the last year.

Socio-cultural analysis

Attributing whale tails to mainstreaming of the sexualization of young women, The Santa Rosa, California Press Democrat termed the trend as "stripper chic". Post-modern thinker Yasmin Jiwani and co-writers described the trend in Girlhood: Redefining the Limits as an attempt to redefine girlhood while acknowledging the debate around it. The book termed the trend as the "slut" look popularized by Britney Spears. Some experts even dubbed visible whale tails as "thong feminism" for young girls. Other experts accused marketers of "outrageous selling of sex to children".

One conjecture assumes that the style of exposed thong may have "bubbled-up" from the street level to the high streets, like the jeans and t-shirt look of James Dean. Another assumes the fad was initiated by glamor model Jordan in England and singers Mariah Carey and Spears in the United States. The phenomenon has been compared to the phenomenon of visible bra straps. Saying that "just as Madonna made bras a public garment in the 1980s, Ms. Lewinsky, Paris Hilton and Britney Spears transformed women's panties into a provocative garment intended for public display", the New York Times claimed that the thong, with straps worn high over the hips and exposed by fashionable low-rise jeans and "Juicy Couture" sweat pants, had become a public icon.

Word of the year

"Whale tail" was selected in January 2006 as the "most creative word" of 2005 by the American Dialect Society, a group of linguists, editors, and academics.  It received 44 votes to muffin top 25, flee-ancée (a reference to runaway bride Jennifer Wilbanks) 15, and pinosaur (a very old Wollemi pine tree near Australia's Blue Mountains) 6.

While discussing these new coinages, Sali Tagliamonte, associate professor of linguistics at the University of Toronto, observed that young women in North America were ahead of young men as influencers. The use of the word to indicate an underwear phenomenon has shown up in serious mainstream news media, sometimes in reference to the pop stars who made the fashion trend popular. Wayne Glowka, member of the Georgia College and State University faculty and head of the New Word Committee of the Dialect Society, said about the happening, "Language is just going on its merry way, creating many new words. It's time for men to win something."

See also

Buttock cleavage
Camel toe
Crop top
Muffin top
Sagging
Underwear as outerwear
Upskirt
Wardrobe malfunction

References

2000s fashion
Popular culture neologisms
2000s slang
Lingerie
Clothing controversies
Sexual slang
2005 neologisms

es:Tanga#Cola de ballena